Bert De Backer (born 2 April 1984) is a Belgian former professional road cyclist.

Major results

2002
 3rd Omloop Het Nieuwsblad Juniors
2007
 6th Vlaamse Havenpijl
2008
 1st Gullegem Koerse
 6th Circuit de Wallonie
 8th Omloop van het Houtland
2010
 7th Schaal Sels
 7th Grand Prix d'Isbergues
2011
 1st  Sprints classification Three Days of De Panne
2012
 10th Kampioenschap van Vlaanderen
2013
 1st Grote Prijs Jef Scherens
2014
 6th Nationale Sluitingsprijs
2019
 8th Paris–Tours
 10th Paris–Bourges
2020
 10th Dwars door het Hageland

Grand Tour general classification results timeline

References

External links

Bert De Backer profile at Skil-Shimano

1984 births
Living people
People from Eeklo
Belgian male cyclists
Cyclists from East Flanders